Gautamiputra Satakarni is a 2017 Indian Telugu-language epic historical action film produced by Y. Rajeev Reddy, Jagarlamudi Saibabu on First Frame Entertainment banner and directed by Krish. Based on the life of 2nd century CE Satavahana ruler Gautamiputra Satakarni, the film stars Nandamuri Balakrishna in the titular role, alongside Shriya Saran, and Hema Malini. It marks Balakrishna's 100th film as an actor. The music is composed by Chirantan Bhatt.

Plot
Gautamiputra Satakarni is the 2nd century CE Satavahana ruler of Amaravati whose dream is to unite all of the 32 kingdoms in the country to stop internal skirmishes and establish peace. He takes an oath to his mother Gautami Balasri, starts his mission at the age of 18, and gives only two options to the kings on his way: peace (by surrendering their sword) or war. After 18 long years, he takes entire South India under his control. For the time being, Satakarni marries Vasishti Devi, and they have a son named Pulumavi (Master Snehit Chowdary). Nahapana, the important ruler of the Western Kshatrapas, is a powerful and villainous person who forcibly locks up the princes of his feudatory kingdoms as royal prisoners to protect his kingdom on all sides. Now, it is a difficult task for Satakarni to reach Nahapana, so he uses a strategy and decides to go along with his son Pulumavi to the battlefield. However, Vasishti opposes, but Satakarni still stubbornly does so. Simultaneously, Greek Emperor Demetrius is waiting at the border for the result of their battle, thereafter to conquer the country. Meanwhile, Satakarni moves towards Nahapana's fort. On the way, he assures the feudatory kings to safeguard and secure their children. Finally, he reaches Nahapana's fort, destroys him, rescues the princes, brings the entire country under one flag, and slaps his thigh.

Satakarni then returns to Amaravathi, with the 32 swords which he has obtained from the rulers of India, and Balasri orders him to make a powerful sword by melting the 32 swords. Everybody welcomes him with great enlightenment and joy, but his wife Vasishti is fed up with his dictatorial mentality. She decides to leave him, but now he has to perform Rajasuya Yaaga, a grand ritual that is impossible without a wife. At the request of her mother-in-law, Vasishti agrees to stay until its completion. During the ritual, the Emperor must give Agra Pooja honor to the topmost person in the kingdom. Satakarni gives it to his mother by spreading the greatness of women, and from there onwards, he changes his name to Gautamiputra Satakarni and also names his son as Vasishtiputra Pulumavi, where his wife Vasishti understands the virtue of her husband. Satakarni declares a new era called Salivahana Sakha and the day starts as Ugadi. That night, Kanjira, one of the feudatory kings, backstabs his compatriots by aiding Demetrius and lets his men enter the fort to knock out Satakarni. Still, Gautami Balasri protects her son by breaking up their tactics.

Satakarni learns that Demetrius has entered the borders of Sindhu Kingdom to conquer the country, whose army is 10 times that of his. He then gets ready for the final battle. At that point, Vasishti senses bad signs that someone has poisoned her husband, so she requests him to avoid this battle when Satakarni explains to her his childhood dream of uniting the entire country which he had done so. Now, he has to protect it from invaders. His only choices are victory or martyrdom. Gauthami Balasri consults a Bhikkhu and explains to him regarding these bad signs, who gives her an antidote to the poison. At last, Satakarni reaches the Sindhu Kingdom. During the first day of battle, Satakrani destroys almost half of the Greek army. There, Demetrius understands that it is difficult to conquer India as long as Satakarni is alive. He sends a woman named Athena (Farah Karima) to Satakarni as a messenger. Unfortunately, he drinks a juice laced with poison that she offers. He foams at the mouth and faints, screaming. The next day, when Satakarni is under treatment, all other Kings are confused as to whether to fight or retreat. They understand the goal of Satakarni is not only to win the country, but also to develop unity among them, and decide to partake in the battle. Meanwhile, Satakarni recovers reach the battlefield, and defeats Demetrius, affirming, "Nobody can destroy the Unity of India".

Cast
 Nandamuri Balakrishna as Gautamiputra Satakarni
 Shriya Saran as Vasishthi Devi, Satakarni's wife
 Hema Malini as Gautami Balasri, Satakarni's mother
 Kabir Bedi as Nahapana
 Milind Gunaji as Kanji
 David Manucharov as Demetrius
 Farah Karimaee as Athena
 Ravi Prakash as Gandaraya
 Tanikella Bharani as Deva Dattudu, Satakarni's messenger 
 Subhalekha Sudhakar as Satakarni's messenger who is killed by Nahapana
 Master Snehith Chowdary as Vasishthiputra Pulumavi, Satakarni's elder son
 Shiva Rajkumar as Kalahasteeshwara (cameo appearance)

Soundtrack

Music composed by Chirantan Bhatt. Music released on Lahari Music Company. The Audio launch was held at Sri Pandit Jawaharlal Nehru Municipal High School Grounds, Tirupati on 26 December 2016. Central Minister Venkaiah Naidu, Andhra Pradesh Chief Minister Nara Chandrababu Naidu attended the function as chief guests, along with hundreds of industry stalwarts.

Production
The film was officially announced on 8 April 2016, on eve of Ugadi at Andhra Pradesh's proposed capital city Amaravati. The movie opening was held at Hyderabad on 22 April 2016, with eminent personalities like K. Chandrasekhar Rao, T. Harish Rao, Chiranjeevi, Venkatesh, K. Raghavendra Rao, Dasari Narayana Rao, Singeetam Srinivasa Rao, Boyapati Srinu, Sai Korrapati, Sriwass, and Akkineni Ramesh Prasad in attendance. The search for the female lead had been going on for long, as actresses like Anushka Shetty and Nayanthara were on the verge of signing. Finally, actress Shriya Saran was signed on as the lead heroine, after being successful in Telugu with various projects. Veteran Hindi actress Hema Malini is playing Balakrishna's character's mother, Gautami Balasri. Actually Devi Sri Prasad was primarily selected as music director but has quit project because he couldn't adjust the dates, after he left the project top most music directors like Ilaiyaraaja, M. M. Keeravani are taken into consideration but finally Chirantan Bhatt is the music director. Neeta Lulla is designing costumes and jewellery for the film.

Nandamuri Balakrishna honoured Hema Malini with a saree as a surprise gift on the sets of the film on 4 September 2016 in Rajasthan. The film's first look teaser was released on 11 October 2016 at 10:15 a.m on the occasion of Vijayadashami and trailer was launched on 16 December 2016 at Tirumala theatre in Karimnagar, Telangana.

Release 
It was released on 12 January 2017 across 1320 screens worldwide.

Reception
Srivathsan Nadadhur of The Hindu gives it a 4/5 rating saying, "The film talks of Telugu identity, re-emphasises Amaravati’s cultural significance, talks of a borderless society, gives Shriya a role of a lifetime and yet remains a Balakrishna film, an achievement for Krish in only his seventh outing." Murali Krishna of Telangana Today says "Gautamiputra Satakarni perfectly blends with the persona of Balakrishna. It is an achievement to bring the lesser-known details of an unsung hero to spotlight and Krish has succeeded in crafting a gripping narrative right from the word go". 10TV editor Kathi Mahesh gives it a 4/5 rating saying, "You will know about the Telugu's history and how they contributed to the nation." IdleBrain Jeevi gives it a 3.25/5 rating and says "a film like Gautamiputra Satakarni should be encouraged by watching in theaters because it introduces us our own Telugu hero who ruled the unified nation."

HMTV Film bureau chief Prabhu praised the film saying "Krish gave a movie which would make Telugus proud and Balakrishna acted in it" and gave it a rating of 4/5 but adds that instead of numbers this is a movie to be visited/reviewed in a different way.  Suresh Kavirayani of Deccan Chronicle gives it a 3.5/5 rating saying "Gautamiputra Satakarni is an original story and everyone, especially the Telugu population, should know about it. Krish should be appreciated for coming up with a script like this and narrating it interestingly. The film is also memorable for its content and the excellent performance by Balayya. Kannada superstar Shiva Rajkumar appears in a cameo and stuns in it.". H Kumar of Firstpost says "Gautamiputra Satakarni is part inspirational, part patriotic that implores Telugu-speaking populace across the world to be proud of their roots. And in doing so, Krish has once again proved himself to be a fascinating storyteller who isn't afraid to walk a less-traveled path."

Awards and nominations

References

External links
 

2017 films
2010s Telugu-language films
Indian historical action films
Indian epic films
Films set in ancient India
History of India on film
Films set in the 2nd century
Films directed by Krish
Indian films based on actual events
Indian biographical films
2010s historical action films
2010s biographical films
Biographical action films
Films shot in Rajasthan
Films set in the Shatavahana Empire